Rammohan College is an undergraduate and postgraduate college for women in Kolkata, India. It is affiliated with the University of Calcutta. It shares premises with City College, Kolkata (morning college) and Anandamohan College (evening college).

See also 
List of colleges affiliated to the University of Calcutta
Education in India
Education in West Bengal

References

External links 

Academic institutions associated with the Bengal Renaissance
Universities and colleges in Kolkata
Universities and colleges affiliated with the Brahmo Samaj
University of Calcutta affiliates
Educational institutions established in 1961
1961 establishments in West Bengal